Royal Bank of Canada Building, Havana is a Neoclassical-style bank building located at corner of Calles Aguiar and Obrapia in Habana Vieja. The ground floor was dedicated to the bank, the other floors to offices that were rented; a floor was added (seventh floor) for a semiprivate restaurant and club.

Built in 1917, the building was designed by New York-based firm Purdy and Henderson, Engineers, but supervised by Sumner Godfrey Davenport, who would subsequently join the bank in Havana in 1920. In the same year Davenport moved to Canada to become the bank's Chief Architect.

This building would be one of Royal Bank of Canada's 65 branches that existed in the 1920s and 24 by the time it was forced to close in 1960.

Gallery

See also 

 Bank of Nova Scotia Building, Havana 1906
 List of banks in Cuba

References 

Buildings and structures in Havana
Office buildings completed in 1917
Neoclassical architecture in Cuba
20th-century architecture in Cuba